Operation Coronado was a series of 11 operations conducted by the American Mobile Riverine Force in conjunction with various units of the Army of the Republic of Vietnam (South Vietnam) in the waterways of the Mekong Delta in the south of the country in an attempt to dismantle guerrilla forces and infrastructure of the Vietcong in the waterways of the Mekong, which had been a communist stronghold. The operations ran sequentially from June 1967 to July 1968.Fulton, pp. 50–150.

The series was named after Coronado Naval Base in California. There the American military had staged planning conference before adopting their riverine military strategy.Fulton, pp. 50–70.

See also
 Operation Coronado II
 Operation Coronado IV
 Operation Coronado V
 Operation Coronado IX
 Operation Coronado X
 Operation Coronado XI

Notes

References 

1967 in Vietnam
1968 in Vietnam
Battles and operations of the Vietnam War
Riverine warfare